

Surname

Ancona 
Ancona is a surname. Notable people with the surname include:

Eligio Ancona del Castillo (1835–1893), Mexican lawyer, author and state governor
George Ancona (born 1929), American photo essayist, author and illustrator of children's books
Mario Ancona (1860–1931), Italian singer
Ronni Ancona (born 1966), British actress and impressionist
Solange Ancona (born 1943), French composer
Sydenham Elnathan Ancona (1824–1913), Democratic member of the U.S. House of Representatives from Pennsylvania

D'Ancona 
D'Ancona or d'Ancona is a surname. 

 Alessandro d'Ancona (1835–1914) Italian writer and critic
 Hedy d'Ancona (born 1937) Dutch politician
 Jacob d'Ancona an Italian Jewish writer. 
 Matthew d'Ancona (born 1968) English journalist
 Mirella Levi D'Ancona (1919–2014) Italian-born American art historian.
 Vito D'Ancona (1825–1884) Italian painter
 Umberto D'Ancona (1896–1964) Italian biologist.

See also

Antona (name)

Italian-language surnames